Saade Vol. 2 is the third studio album by Swedish singer Eric Saade. It was released on November 30, 2011 by Roxy Recordings. The album was released as the second part of the album series, following Saade Vol. 1 (2011).

Saade Vol. 2 has spawned one single, "Hotter Than Fire". The single was released on November 2, 2011 as the first and the only single from the album. The song peaked at number five in Sweden as well as reaching top 40 in Belgium. The song features the guest vocal by American singer Dev.

Commercially, the album was a success, becoming Saade's second number one album in Sweden and ranked as the eighth best-selling album of 2011 in the country. It also charted at number forty-six in Finland.

Background
In May 2011, it revealed that Saade would release his upcoming album Saade in two parts. As the reason for that Saade said: “I didn't wanna waste too many songs on one album, so I decided to do two parts of my Album Saade. We have been working day and night with the sounds, to be correct and find the right synths etc. I just felt that I'm in a great songwriting mood, so I had to release two parts because of all these songs.” To do this step, he was inspired by Robyn who released her album Body Talk in three parts.

From 21 November until 29 November 2011, scandipop.co.uk released previews of the songs. On 27 November 2011, wackymusiccrazy.org released previews of the songs Explosive Love, Rocket Science and Fingerprints.

Track listing

All album credits taken from the booklet contained within the CD and of the iTunes files. The latter track is not included on the iTunes version of the album but credits contained in the physical album booklet.

Awards, nominations and certifications
The album was nominated for a Scandipop Award 2011 in the category Best Male Album.

Singles
The first single of the album "Hotter Than Fire" was first released on 2 November 2011 in Sweden. It is a collaboration with American singer Dev. The song reached #5 in Sweden.

Charts

Weekly charts

Year-end charts

Certifications

Release history

References

External links 
Eric Saade Official Website
Eric Saade Official Facebook

2011 albums
Eric Saade albums